James Henry Drummond (October 20, 1918 – December 12, 1950) was a Canadian former professional ice hockey defenceman. He played in the National Hockey League (NHL) for the New York Rangers. Drummond was born in Toronto, Ontario, Canada.

Drummond played junior hockey with the Toronto Marlboros and Oshawa Generals, with which he won the 1939 Memorial Cup. Drummond next moved on to senior hockey with the Toronto Goodyears, Toronto Marlboros senior team, and other senior teams in the Toronto area. Drummond enlisted during World War II, and prior to shipping overseas played for military teams in Cornwall, Ontario.

Drummond returned after the war and signed with the New York Rangers. He got into two games with the New York Rangers in the 1944–45 season, but spent his professional career with minor league teams Hershey Bears, New York Rovers, Cleveland Barons and Philadelphia Rockets before retiring from hockey in 1949 due to illness. He would succumb to the illness in the hospital in Peterborough, Ontario in 1950, aged 32.

External links

1918 births
1950 deaths
Canadian ice hockey defencemen
Ice hockey people from Toronto
New York Rangers players
New York Rovers players
Canadian expatriate ice hockey players in the United States
Canadian military personnel of World War II